Abingdon is a census-designated place in Harford County, Maryland, United States.

Demographics

History 
Abingdon was named after Abingdon, England.
The town was founded by and is the birthplace of William Paca, a signer of the Declaration of Independence and the third Governor of Maryland.  Abingdon was the site of Cokesbury College, the first Methodist college in the United States.

Woodside was listed on the National Register of Historic Places in 1979. The Nelson-Reardon-Kennard House was listed in 1991.

Abingdon changed from an unincorporated community to a census-designated place for the 2020 census.

Schools
Since it is located in Harford County, the community of Abingdon is served by the Harford County Board of Education, which consists of an elected-appointed Board of six elected members and three members appointed by the Governor of the State of Maryland. Most students in the Abingdon area who enter kindergarten and progress to the fifth grade attend William S. James Elementary School or Abingdon Elementary School. Upon the opening of Patterson Mill High School in 2007, a majority of students attending William S. James Elementary School began to attend this new facility. Additionally, all of the students at Abingdon Elementary School subsequently attend Edgewood High School. A third primary school, William Paca/Old Post Road Elementary School, is located on the border of Abingdon and Edgewood. These students also attend the Edgewood or Joppatowne secondary schools. The older Deerfield Elementary and Edgewood High school buildings were replaced by newer, updated facilities by the same name in 2010.

Prior to Kindergarten, children can attend various child care and preschool programs such as Kiddie Academy whose headquarters are also located in the community of Abingdon.
At a Board of Education meeting on the July 13, 2020, it was discussed to change the name of the William S. Paca elementary school as many families protest attending a school named after a slave holder.

References

External links 

Abingdon, Maryland

Census-designated places in Harford County, Maryland
Census-designated places in Maryland